Martin Burke (born February 12 in Austin, Texas) is an American voice actor and theatre actor based in Austin, Texas.

He voiced Sonic the Hedgehog in the English-language release of the Sonic the Hedgehog OVA and Sumida in Dai-Guard, while he has also had acting roles in underground films like Lethal Force and Blood Chase. He also voiced Shiro Amakusa in Ninja Resurrection.

Filmography

References

External links
 

Living people
Place of birth missing (living people)
American male stage actors
American male voice actors
Male actors from Austin, Texas
Year of birth missing (living people)
20th-century American male actors
21st-century American male actors